"She's Tough" is a song recorded by Canadian country music artist Duane Steele. It was released in 1996 as the fourth single from his debut album, P.O. Box 423. It peaked at number 10 on the RPM Country Tracks chart in February 1997.

Chart performance

Year-end charts

References

1996 songs
1996 singles
Duane Steele songs
Mercury Records singles
Songs written by Steve Bogard
Songs written by Jeff Stevens (singer)